La muerte de un burócrata (Death of a Bureaucrat) is a 1966 comedy film by Cuban director Tomás Gutiérrez Alea which pokes fun at the Communist bureaucracy and red tape and how it affects the lives of the common people who have to waste time and overcome hurdles just to get on with their ordinary lives.

"It is, as the title suggests, a satire on bureaucracy and red tape, but also on a lot of other sad and mediocre things which we have to put up with at times. However, I have to say that I don’t have much faith in the efficacy of satire as a “driving force of history.” When making the film we thought: we are laughing at the bureaucrats, but then the bureaucrats will come and not only will the film make them laugh, but they will laugh at themselves."— Tomás Gutiérrez Alea, Director’s Statement, La Biennale di Venezia

Plot 
The story begins with the death of a model worker, who is buried with his labor card as a badge of honor. However, his widow is told she needs that card to claim the benefits she is entitled to. The story then takes several surreal turns, as the family of the dead man tries to recover the precious card from the grave. As they succeed to do so, the bureaucracy grows into a formidable enemy: Their wish to re-bury the husband is turned down, because all the official documents show he already has been buried...

Cast
 Salvador Wood as Nephew
 Silvia Planas as Aunt
 Manuel Estanillo as Bureaucrat
 Omar Alfonso as Cojimar
 Tania Alvarado
 Pedro Pablo Astorga
 Alicia Bustamante
 Gaspar De Santelices as Nephew's boss
 Rafael Díaz
 Roberto Gacio
 Carlos Gargallo
 Elsa Montero as Sabor
 Rolando de los Reyes
 Fausto Rodríguez
 Luis Romay as El Zorro
 Carlos Ruiz de la Tejera as Psychiatrist
 Rafael Sosa
 Richard Suarez as Tarafa
 Rolando Vidal
 Laura Zarrabeitia

Distribution 
"The film was wildly popular in Cuban theaters, but, reportedly, because of its bitter mockery of key elements in Cuba’s emerging socialist society, Alea had to have the film smuggled out of Cuba for its release in the US."

Awards
Special Jury Prize – Karlovy Vary International Film Festival, shared with Jean-Paul Rappeneau's La Vie de château

Reception
"A satiric comment on contemporary Cuban society, it is also a film deeply attuned to the history of the cinema, with references to and echoes of Chaplin, Laurel & Hardy, and Buñuel, among others, all cited in the opening credits."

"It is a black-and-white, full-length comedy about a country which has undergone a socialist revolution and now insists its bureaucrats provide equal treatment for all, including the dead. The newly socialist country is a thinly veiled Cuba, and the comedic twists and characters reminiscent of Hollywood comedy traditions and stars such as Charles Chaplin, Laurel and Hardy, Buster Keaton and even Marilyn Monroe; also included is a touch of surrealism and black humor reminiscent of Buñuel."

Allusions 
The machinery of the Martí bus factory references Chaplin's Modern Times. The fight at the cemetery gates references Laurel & Hardy's fights. Juanchin's dreams reference Buñuel's An Andalusian Dog.

Alea dedicates, in the initial credits, to these, Ingmar Bergman, Akira Kurosawa and other film directors.

Preservation
La Muerte de un Burócrata was preserved by the Academy Film Archive in 2019.

See also 
 List of Cuban films

References

External links 
 La Revolución Cubana filmada por Tomás Gutiérrez Alea
 Tomas Gutierrez Alea: The Dialectics of a Filmmaker
 

Cuban comedy films
1960s Spanish-language films
Films critical of communism
Films directed by Tomás Gutiérrez Alea
1966 comedy films
1966 films